The EAD Airframe Version 2, or V2, is a small American unmanned aircraft.  It has been described as 'solid state', as there are no moving parts in the propulsion system; all thrust is powered by the phenomenon known as ion wind. It is being developed at the Massachusetts Institute of Technology (MIT) Department of Aeronautics and Astronautics by engineer Steven Barrett (associate professor of aeronautics and astronautics) and others.

It is claimed to be the first ion-propelled airplane. Tethered ion-propelled aircraft without wings have existed since the 1960s. These had ground-based high-voltage power supplied to the aircraft via a wire.

Design and development
The aircraft is a flying wing made of very light materials, including carbon-fibre, shrink-wrap plastic, balsa wood, polystyrene, and Kevlar. It has a very wide open frame serving as a fuselage, in and below which thin wires are strung horizontally.

The MIT engineers were able fine tune the aircraft to find the best design and power requirement by employing a technique known as geometric programming.

Propulsion
The aircraft is an example of an ionocraft, which is powered by an ionic wind generated through controlled electrical discharge.

The fuselage contains a stack of 54 lithium-polymer batteries. With the aid of a power supply unit these deliver a minimum of 20,000 volts of electrical potential, producing enough corona discharge to propel the aircraft. Air at the front of the wing is ionized by an electrical field near thin filaments of wire called emitters. Elsewhere on the airframe, collectors attract these positively charged ions. As the ions travel toward the collectors, they collide with air molecules. Energy is transferred from the ions to the air molecules, thereby producing air flow; the thrust propels the aircraft forwards, fast enough to gain flying speed, with the conventional wings providing aerodynamic lift.

Operational history
The aircraft has flown at least eleven times, in the duPont Athletic Center, an indoor gymnasium on the MIT campus.

References

External links
 MIT website page showing video of aircraft in flight

2010s United States experimental aircraft
Unmanned aerial vehicles of the United States